Daniel J. Kelleher (February 5, 1864 – February 1929) was the chairman of the Board of Directors of the Seattle National Bank and took an active part in consolidating two of the largest banks in Seattle, Washington, the Puget Sound National and the Seattle National, now known as the Seattle National Bank, the largest bank in the State of Washington.

Early life
He was born in Middleborough, Massachusetts, to parents Daniel and Mary Kelleher. He attended public schools, and Harvard University, graduating in the class of 1885. He was a private tutor and law student in Syracuse, New York, from 1885 to 1890.

Professional life
In 1890, he relocated to Seattle, forming a law partnership with Judge George Meade Emory, and was actively engaged in the practice of law, as a member of that firm (later Bausman, Kelleher, Oldham & Goodale).

For several years he divided his time between banking and the law. On September 1, 1914, he retired from the law practice to give his whole time to the Seattle National Bank, as active chairman of the board of directors. Kelleher was also president of the Bank for Savings in Seattle, of the Bank of Commerce of Everett, and a director and on the executive committee of the Bank of Commerce of Anacortes, Washington.

He was president of the Riverside Timber Co., owning large timber lands in the State of Washington. He was one of the founders of the Harvard Club of Seattle, and was for several years its president.

References
Shenandoah Homesteads - Dunmore Mt. Airy
Shenandoah Homesteads - Strathmoor

1864 births
1929 deaths
American bankers
Harvard University alumni
Washington (state) lawyers
19th-century American lawyers